Harvey Mansion is a historic home located at New Bern, Craven County, North Carolina.  It was built about 1793, and is a three-story, brick dwelling with an exposed basement. The house was built by John Harvey who used it as a residential home and also for commercial space. The Harvey was a multi-purpose building for hundreds of years since it was first erected. Throughout its lifetime The Harvey has been an apartment house, boarding school, military academy, and temporary barracks for elements of the Union Army and was the original home of what is now Craven Community College. 

It is listed on the National Register of Historic Places since 1971.

References

External links
Harvey Mansion website

Historic American Buildings Survey in North Carolina
Bed and breakfasts in North Carolina
Houses on the National Register of Historic Places in North Carolina
Georgian architecture in North Carolina
Houses completed in 1810
Houses in New Bern, North Carolina
National Register of Historic Places in Craven County, North Carolina